Not to be mistaken for Assault (arcade game)

Assault, known in North America as Assault: Retribution, is a 1998 action video game developed by Candle Light Studios for the PlayStation console. It was published in North America by Midway Games and in Europe by Telstar.

Gameplay 
Assault: Retribution is a 3D combat shoot 'em up style game that heavily focuses on the combat. The game is set in an outer-space environment with hordes of aliens attacking the player. Players can take control of either two characters Reno or Kelly, the two soldiers send down to protect the city of Arcadia from the aliens.

Development 
Assault was the sole game developed by Candle Light Studios, a development forged from a team of ex-Accolade designers who had worked on the futuristic combat sports title, Pitball. Before release the game was proclaimed a Contra killer by PSM Online.

Reception 

The game received mixed reviews according to the review aggregation website GameRankings. Craig Harris of IGN said, "It's obvious these guys watched a lot of science-fiction movies before sitting down and designing Assault. Literally, this game looks like Robocop killing Starship Troopers aliens". Peter Bartholow of GameSpot said, "While the basics may sound playable enough, Assaults problems are almost too many to list in this review."

References

External links

1998 video games
Alien invasions in video games
Midway video games
Multiplayer and single-player video games
PlayStation (console) games
PlayStation (console)-only games
Shooter video games
Video games developed in the United Kingdom